The Interton Video 2400 is a dedicated first-generation home video game console that was released in 1975 by Interton. It is the successor of the Interton Video 2000 and the predecessor of the Interton Video 2501. It could output only black and white. The consoles uses the AY-3-8500 chipset. The sound is played through an internal speaker, rather than the TV set.

The console was also released in France by Thomson under the name JV1T and by Continental Edison under the name JV-2701.

Notes

References 

Dedicated consoles
First-generation video game consoles
Home video game consoles
1970s toys